Superfast Rock n' Roll Played Slow is the third studio album by American singer/songwriter Tess Wiley, released on April 27, 2007.

Track listing
"Halfway Through" 
"Raise Your Hand" 
"Crying for You"
"Idle" 
"Messed Up Everywhere Blues" 
"All for You"
"Tenderness and love" 
"Slow"  
"Some Old Way Out" 
"What it comes down to"
"Anette"

All songs by Tess Wiley, except "Messed Up Everywhere Blues" by Jason Harrod.

Personnel
Tess Wiley - guitar, vocals

References

2007 albums
Tess Wiley albums
Tapete Records albums